Fraser Hart Kershaw Jr. is an American activist from the Virgin Islands in the clean water movement throughout the United States and Latin America. He made his television debut acting as multiple characters in the 2016 televised international feature film Behind the Water. He was a figure in the new industry of filmmaking for the U.S. Virgin Islands. On 26 January 2021, Kershaw was announced as the head coach of the men's soccer program at the Pennsylvania State University, Altoona in the United States.

Early life and Fútbol 
From an early age Kershaw grew up playing under premiere youth teams. Kershaw grew up with the game playing internationally. Throughout his career playing in the United States, The Virgin Islands, Europe and Latin America.  Kershaw spent his late teens on the island of St. John, Virgin Islands. On the island, Kershaw would carry a five-gallon tank of drinking water for several blocks up a steep hill in 100-degree heat to his home. His mother worked as a medical missionary in natural disasters in Latin America. In 2006, Kershaw relocated to the city of Morelia, in the country of Mexico. His father from the Caribbean was a landscaper and artist.

Biography

2014–2019: Breakthrough 
On 19 July 2014 The Sacramento Observer announced Kershaw and National Geographic's Doug Clevenger in the capital of California to showcase a televised portion of a new film about water. When Kershaw appeared on AT&T he stated the global water problem could be solved one town at a time. Premiering on earth day 2016 Caribbean Entertainment Magazine stated Kershaw's film, Behind the Water, reached every territory in the Caribbean, Canada, the UK and the northeast United States. He hosted the 2016 televised feature film Behind the Water. Kershaw and musician Brent Kutzle from OneRepublic collaborate on the musical score for the film. Film Score Monthly, magazine showcased the score to incorporate a blend of strings and bass.

The Jamaican diaspora states Kershaw helps the Caribbean people with life giving efforts that spark change . Kershaw can be seen in television commercials that are noted as earth friendly. Kershaw is seen in Movie Maker Magazine collaborating with Greg Mellott and Francis Ford Coppola on a new art form called live cinema. Modern Traveler Magazine showcased Kershaw filming in never before documented areas of Latin America. Travel Magazine stated Kershaw has slept in huts without electricity to luxurious accommodations and these experiences reinforced his opinion that no matter the environment everybody deserves the right to drink clean water. The Toronto Yogi Times recorded Kershaw voicing his concern for possible solutions in Los Angeles . On 7 April 2019 he was recognized as an influencer for the United States Virgin Islands film industry. The VI Consortium claimed the first film festival to be a success. Kershaw, with a group from the U.S. Virgin Islands Department of Tourism, USVI Council on the Arts, Crucian Gold, Cape Air, CBS, ABC, and the Economic Development Authority (EDA) formed the first Caribbean Film and Artistic Cinematic Festival.

Public speaking and activism 
Kershaw can be seen presenting at public university film forums. Kershaw has contributed his experiences to public universities. While performing in the theater he's known to become emotional and challenge the audience. At the University of Oklahoma Kershaw performed and challenged the student body to pursue their purpose with life changing ideas. Kershaw addressed the country of El Salvador on national news across 7 million homes bringing together congressional leaders and administration officials in hopes to furnish clean water to communities. The Caribbean's Drive Time Radio Show publicized Kershaw's clean water campaign and recorded him speaking out against the lack of sanitation in rural communities and he said, "If everybody stops going to the bathroom right now then we can save lives, but that’s never going to happen." Kershaw was called 'He No Faking Jamaican' for his activism in the Caribbean.

In 2014, Kershaw documented and explored the communities of Port-au-Prince with overwhelming obstacles. In November 2014 he publicly spoke with community leaders in the capital of Haiti about launching health campaigns for community leaders to provide clean water. He was recorded saying, "I know the Haitian people because I am the Haitian people, we are both human, one and the same, we thirst together and we drink together, we want water that heals instead of steals." He received the nickname 'The Prince of Hope' for his efforts to provide clean water in Port-au-Prince, Haiti. Kershaw and Dr. Jennifer Hetzner of California appeared on ABC presenting the impact of dirty water.

On 22 January 2015 The Nevada Today reported Kershaw at the Wells Fargo Auditorium performing at the University of Nevada, Reno and the student body became energized from Kershaw's performance by winning their hearts and minds with his ability to inspire through his work. Filmmaker Kari Barber reported Kershaw turning their world upside down.

On 24 February 2015 Kershaw presented at the International Law Society speaker series at the Maurer School of Law in Indiana University where he presented his international experiences working with pillars of rural cinema. On 28 March 2015 he helped start a film festival for the student body at the University of Cincinnati where he encouraged the filmmakers to be fearless and compared the event to a sweaty gym full of boxers ready to spar. Cincinnati.com reported the film festival an important piece of history for Cincinnati, and native Steven Spielberg will be proud to see the film industry grow within the city.

In Lawrence, Kansas on Earth Day 2015, Kershaw performed in a full theater at the University of Kansas and during the event Kershaw said, "This Earth Day, we are far beyond a debate about the importance of water." He added, "We're focused on taking action, preparing communities here locally on leading an international effort for action." The University of Kansas Department of Film and Media studies stated "Kershaw inspired and energized, entertained their thoughts about helping while still remaining very personable and humble." Kershaw has said while performing he hopes people will continue to chase after life-changing ideas and passions.

Coaching Legacy 
100 Years, 4 Generations of Coaching History

The U.S. Soccer Players organization linked Kershaw to World Cup Coach Bill Jeffrey, who led the USA Men's National Soccer Team at the 1950 World Cup in Brazil. Jeffrey, the Scottish native led the U.S.A. men's team over England in one of the greatest upsets in world cup history and later died in 1966. Jeffrey's Penn State coaching lineage worked through four generations. By 1970, the captain of Jeffrey's 1950 world cup team, Walter Bahr became head coach from 1974-1988. His assistant, Barry Gorman, became head coach through the 2009 season. In 2021, the connection to Jeffrey continues with Coach Gorman’s youth player, Fraser Kershaw, who entered the head coaching job at Penn State Altoona. The connection of four separate generations of soccer, reaching a 100-year continual coaching succession.  

In Kershaw's first year as a NCAA head coach, he led a very young Penn State soccer team to the program’s first winning record in half-a-decade. His men's soccer program had the best start since 2007 with a nationally ranked offense earning player awards regionally and national. The Altoona Mirror stated Kershaw was the right man for the job. April 16, 2021 Nuno Gomes of the Portugal national football team congratulating Kershaw and the Penn State team members.

In 2022, Kershaw is the head coach of The King's College Men's Soccer team in Manhattan, New York City in the United States. At sunrise, Kershaw can be seen jogging with soccer players under the Statue of Liberty in Brooklyn, New York. The World Soccer Talk quoted him stating, “She is holding up a yellow card to me as a warning” 

In 2023, Kershaw is a youth coach at Philadelphia Union in the Major League within the United States.

Charity work and other interests 
Kershaw started an initiative called Water Works and said its focus is to provide clean and safe drinking water to people in developing nations. He has said in Vitamin Retailer Magazine that Water Works started the day he saw people weeping over water-related deaths. The Fort Lauderdale Daily News boasted Kershaw using its airport as his launch pad to give people clean water. The Lodi news said while Kershaw was in Indonesia he lost ten pounds from a water borne illness and a doctor traveled to document Kershaw's condition.

Green Clean Magazine declared Kershaw as one of the "People We Love" stating he believes the new generation is done with people who spew facts, figures, and formulas for fun and there must be a call to action. Modern Latina Magazine showed Kershaw studying sugar samples from tree leaves as a way to pinpoint a drought to assess solutions with its data. Luxury Travel Magazine featured Kershaw testing out prototype luggage designed by the Swedish brand Thule Group.

Kershaw created an international soccer tournament in Virginia which brought support to orphans and widows. Kershaw has stated in an interview that every person dreams of being loved and accepted and along the way many lose faith in humanity and his team's goal is to inspire everyone on the planet who loves fellow humans to empower another Spirit, engage with the world, and make a difference. Kershaw has worked in rural areas assisting people with clean water and Mother Earth News compared the process to a wild ride.

Personal life
Kershaw lives in Los Angeles, California. He mentioned when he travels he gains clarity about important decisions versus when he is inside his own bubble at home. Kershaw said in Carib Entertainment Magazine that he likes when failure is possible because it makes him feel alive and that failure excites him as it mimics life and drives his projects. It has been recorded that he throws away his cell phone while doing creative work.

Kershaw has talked about eliminating things in his life which gives him time to reach big goals. He claims his most difficult challenge while helping others is his ego and himself and has never accepted a dime for his efforts. Kershaw has said he will dance around anyone blocking the basic human right of clean drinking water.

References

External links

Behind the Water official site

Living people
Year of birth missing (living people)
American male film actors
20th-century American male actors
21st-century American male actors
21st-century American dramatists and playwrights
American male stage actors
American male television actors
American male voice actors
Male actors from Pennsylvania
Male actors from California
Activists from California
California Baptist University alumni
American soccer coaches